Extrusomes are membrane-bound structures in some eukaryotes which, under certain conditions, discharge their contents outside the cell.  There are a variety of different types, probably not homologous, and serving various functions.  

Notable extrusomes include mucocysts, which discharge a mucous mass sometimes used in cyst formation, and trichocysts, which discharge a fibrous rod.  The stinging nematocysts found in Cnidarian animals may be regarded as extrusomes as well. Extrusomes found in dinoflagellates are important in the formation of red and black tides.

References

External links

 Image: extrusome (labeled EX)

Organelles